Joint Statement of the Leaders of the Five Nuclear-Weapon States on Preventing Nuclear War and Avoiding Arms Races is a joint statement about controlling the use of nuclear weapons, preventing nuclear war, and avoiding arms races, signed on January 3, 2022, by China, France, Russia, the United Kingdom, and the United States, the five NPT-designated nuclear-weapon states and permanent members of the United Nations Security Council.

Reactions 
United Nations Secretary-General António Guterres welcomed the joint statement. Ma Zhaoxu, vice-minister of Ministry of Foreign Affairs in China, said in a media interview that the joint statement, the first by the leaders of the five countries on nuclear weapons, reflects the political will of the five countries to prevent nuclear war and sends a common voice to maintain global strategic stability and reduce the risk of nuclear conflict.

See also 
 No first use
 Treaty on the Non-Proliferation of Nuclear Weapons

References 

2022 treaties
Nuclear weapons policy
International security
Nuclear weapons of the People's Republic of China
Nuclear weapons of France
Nuclear weapons of Russia
Nuclear weapons of the United Kingdom
Nuclear weapons of the United States